Cyril Chapman Longden, KPM, (1873–1913) was the sixth British colonial Inspector-General of Police in Ceylon (Sri Lanka).

Longden was born on 1 November 1873, the fourth child and second son of Sir James Robert Longden (1827–1891) and Alice Emily née Berridge (1846–1910). Sir James Longden was the Governor of Trinidad between 1870 and 1874, the Governor of British Guiana between 1874 and 1876, and the Governor of Ceylon until 1883.

Longden was the District Superintendent of Police, Madras Police.

In 1905 the position of Inspector-General of Police and Prisons in Ceylon, was separated into two posts with the incumbent Major Albert Walter De Wilton continuing in the Prisons role and Longden, on loan from India, appointed as Inspector General of Police of Ceylon. Longden was instrumental in establishing a Police Training School for new recruits and a Criminal Investigation Department.

In 1910 Ivor Edward David was appointed as Inspector General of Police and Longden returned to his position in Madras.

In 1911 he was awarded the King's Police Medal, whilst he was the District Superintendent of Police, Indian Police, Madras.

He died unmarried on 22 February 1913 in South Kensington, London, leaving effects of nearly 5,000 pounds (worth about 437,000 pounds in 2015).

References

1873 births
1913 deaths
British colonial police officers
Sri Lankan Inspectors General of Police
Colonial recipients of the Queen's Police Medal
British police officers in India
British people in colonial India
British people in British Ceylon